Jennifer Hall (born October 20, 1977) is an American actress most known for starring as a fictionalized version of herself on the HBO series Unscripted and playing Missy on the NBC sitcom Up All Night.

Early career
Jennifer Hall studied at Solano Community College, Fairfield, CA; Ithaca College, Ithaca, NY, (BFA in Musical Theater in 1999) and made her film acting debut in the movie Confessions of a Dangerous Mind. Hall performed in various Broadway and off-Broadway shows, including The Wild Party with Eartha Kitt, and is part of the band Thistle LLC, performing under the name Speedie.

Current career
Hall has guest starred in many TV shows including Law & Order: Special Victims Unit, Sabrina the Teenage Witch, Monk, Nip/Tuck, House, CSI: Crime Scene Investigation and Private Practice. Hall has also had a regular role on Unscripted as herself and writer and performer of Fluffy Bunnies and Big Brother on #1.4, she also starred in the Legally Blonde, an unsold TV pilot as Elle Woods.

Hall co-starred on the first season of the NBC sitcom Up All Night as Missy, Ava's long suffering assistant.

Filmography

Film

Television

References

External links
 

1977 births
Living people
American television actresses
American film actresses
Ithaca College alumni
Place of birth missing (living people)
21st-century American women